Aliens is a text-only clone of Space Invaders written for the CP/M operating system and made to be operated on the early Kaypro line of luggable computers. It was written by Yahoo Software of Los Angeles, California. Along with Star Trek, CatChum, and Ladder, Aliens was one of the games that came with the early Kaypro computers.

Gameplay

The game runs in text mode; the aliens are made of letters and punctuation marks. Each level was given a name, displayed on top of the screen, such as "Blood Bath" and "We Come in Peace."

References

CP/M games
Fixed shooters
Video game clones
Video games developed in the United States
Video games with textual graphics